AD Torrejón CF Femenino is a Spanish women's football team from Torrejón de Ardoz and the women's section of AD Torrejón. It was one of the leading teams in the Community of Madrid, playing in the Spanish premier league between 2002 and 2011. In 2016 the club was re-activated.

Former internationals
  Brazil: Milene Domingues
  Equatorial Guinea: Jade Boho
  Italy: Giorgia Motta
  Spain: Mar Prieto, Laura del Río, Keka Vega, Silvia Zarza

Competition record

1 Puebla won the final on penalties.

References

Women's football clubs in Spain
Association football clubs established in 1996
Football clubs in the Community of Madrid
1996 establishments in Spain
Sport in Torrejón de Ardoz